Caique can refer to:

Caique, four species of parrots in the genus Pionites
Caïque or caique (also called "kaiki"), a type of Turkish and Greek wooden fishing boat
Carlos "Caique" Elias, practitioner of Brazilian jiu-jitsu

Given name
Caíque da Silva Maria (born 1998), Brazilian footballer who plays as a midfielder
Caíque da Silva Santos (born 1994), Brazilian footballer who plays as a forward
Caíque de Jesus Gonçalves (born 1995), Brazilian footballer who plays as a midfielder
Caique Ferreira da Silva Leite (born 1992), nicknamed Valdivia, Brazilian footballer who plays as a midfielder
Caíque França (born 1995), Brazilian footballer who plays as a goalkeeper
Caíque Luiz Santos da Purificação (born 1997), Brazilian footballer who plays as a goalkeeper
Caíque Silva Rocha (born 1987), Brazilian footballer who plays as a midfielder
Caíque Silva Sá (born 1992), Brazilian footballer who plays as a defender
Caíque Venâncio Lemes (born 1993), simply known as Caíque, Brazilian footballer
Caíque (footballer, born 2 July 2000), Caíque Calito Fernandes Costa, Brazilian football forward
Caíque (footballer, born 18 July 2000), Caíque de Jesus da Silva, Brazilian football forward

See also
Cacique, several birds in the passerine bird genus Cacicus of the New World blackbird family
Cacique (disambiguation)
Cauque mauleanum, a species of fish in the family Atherinidae, endemic to Chile